The  Charlotte Rage season was the first for the Arena Football League (AFL) franchise. They were coached by Babe Parilli. The Rage finished 3–7 and failed to qualify for the playoffs.

Regular season

Schedule

Standings

z – clinched homefield advantage

y – clinched division title

x – clinched playoff spot

Roster

References

External links
1992 Charlotte Rage on ArenaFan.com

Charlotte Rage
Charlotte Rage
Charlotte Rage seasons